Westwood Heath is a southwestern suburb of the City of Coventry in the West Midlands, England.

It is bordered by the suburbs of Cannon Park and Canley, and by the University of Warwick campus to the east, the suburb of Tile Hill to the north, Tile Hill Village and the village of Burton Green to the west, and rural Warwickshire to the south. Westwood Heath is considered to be one of the most prosperous districts of Coventry.

Local landmarks
Some of the notable landmarks in the Westwood Heath area include:

St John the Baptist Church
Greek Orthodox Church
Westwood Business Park
The Westwood Club
Coventry University Sports Ground

References

Suburbs of Coventry